Buchcice  (formerly Meszna Szlachecka) is a village in the administrative district of Gmina Tuchów, within Tarnów County, Lesser Poland Voivodeship, in southern Poland.

The village has a population of 660.

References

Villages in Tarnów County